Adalberts Bubenko (16 January 1910  – 7 July 1983) was a Latvian athlete, who competed mainly in the 50 kilometre walk.

He competed for Latvia in the 1936 Summer Olympics held in Berlin, Germany in the 50 kilometre walk where he won the bronze medal.

References

External links
 
 

1910 births
1983 deaths
People from Mulgi Parish
Latvian male racewalkers
Olympic athletes of Latvia
Olympic bronze medalists for Latvia
Olympic bronze medalists in athletics (track and field)
Athletes (track and field) at the 1936 Summer Olympics
Medalists at the 1936 Summer Olympics